Wynberg Boys' High School is a public English medium boys high school situated in the suburb of Wynberg of  Cape Town in the Western Cape province of South Africa. Founded in 1841, it is one of the best academic schools in Cape Town, it is believed by scholars and old boys to be the second oldest school in South Africa, however, there are several schools that were established at earlier dates as far back as 1738.

History

In 1841, John McNaughton re-opened the doors of his school, the "Established School at Wynberg", in Glebe Cottage with 16 pupils enrolled. McNaughton's school shared the cottage with the Lady D'Urban School of Industry for young ladies.

Initially a co-educational school, it limited enrollment to boys in 1853. The senior and junior schools operated as one school until 1943 when they separated.

In 1845, the school moved to Bryndewyn Cottage. In 1863, the Government relegated the school to the status of "second class elementary school" and instructed the headmaster, Mr. MacNaughton to close on 27 February. Permission was granted to change Wynberg Boys to a private school on 2 March.

A building was purchased from the Higgs estate in 1876, and in 1891, Sir Herbert Baker designed new buildings that opened in 1892.  In 1980, the school moved to its current site on the Hawthornden Estate in Wynberg.

The school has two museums. Two books have been written on Wynberg: The History of a School (1961) by English teacher Doug Thompson, and A School Reflects (1991) by Old Boy Roger Goodwin.

The school's motto, Supera Moras, can be translated from Latin as Overcome Difficulties.

There is an unofficial motto that is used frequently for marketing, "Brothers in an endless chain"

Sporting activities
Wynberg Boys' High School has a competitive sporting tradition. Students take part in sporting competitions, with schools from Western Cape and sometimes from other parts of South Africa, as well as occasional competitions with visiting international teams. Rivals include Rondebosch Boys' High School, Diocesan College, and Paul Roos Gymnasium as well as South African College Schools.

The school offers sporting facilities such as an astro turf area, a swimming pool, tennis and squash courts, four rugby fields, and the WBHS cricket field, which was renamed in 2010 as "The Jacques Kallis Oval" in honour of the World cricketer of the year and former Wynberg Boy.

Culture
The WBHS music department boasts a large collection of bands that play a range of music from jazz to classical. Choir and band members are offered professional training. WBHS has three fundamental school bands: the Concert Band, the Steel Band and the Jazz Band, however also has smaller ensembles for guitarists and string players. With a nod to the Scottish history of the school, Wynberg is one of only a handful of schools that has a bagpipe band. The Wynberg Boys' and Girls' High bands come together every year to form the Combined Band, playing at many inter-school events.

Every year Wynberg Boys' High School holds a memorial day celebrating the school's founding. The school pays tribute to Wynberg Old Boys who died fighting in World War I, World War II and the South African Border War. In World War I, 42 Wynberg Old Boys were killed.

Notable alumni

Rugby
Toskie Smith, Springbok forward (1891–96)
Dave Stewart, Springbok centre/flyhalf (1960–65)
Franklin Bertolini, Namibian Prop (2014)
Dougie Holton, Springbok prop (1960)
Doug Hopwood, Springbok no. 8 (1960–65)
Lionel Wilson, Springbok fullback (1960–65)
Rob Louw, Springbok flank (1980–84)
Sikhumbuzo Notshe, Springbok flank (2018)
Gary Gold, Former Springbok, Western Province rugby coach, Current head coach at Worcester Warriors.

Cricket

Jacques Kallis, South African cricketer
Allan Lamb, England cricketer
Garth Le Roux, South African cricketer
Charl Willoughby, South African cricketer
Shadley van Schalkwyk, Chevrolet Knights cricketer
Dominic Telo, Cape Cobras and Derbyshire cricketer
Richard Levi, Cape Cobras cricketer and South African cricketer
Kyle Verreynne, Western Province cricket team and South African cricketer

Hockey
- 

Roy Clark...Springbok hockey team 197.?
Wayne Denne, South African Hockey Team
Rhett Halkett, South Africa Hockey Captain 2013
Lloyd Norris-Jones, South African Hockey Team
Ian Haley, South African Hockey Team

Other
Vic Clapham, founder of the Comrades Marathon
Hendrik Verwoerd, Former Prime Minister of South Africa 
Andrew Feinstein,  South African politician
Michael Gelfand, distinguished Professor of tropical medicine

Notable staff

 Jani Allan, columnist and radio commentator

References

External links
Wynberg Boys' High official site

Schools in Cape Town
Educational institutions established in 1841
Boarding schools in South Africa
Boys' schools in South Africa
1841 establishments in the Cape Colony
Wynberg, Cape Town
Herbert Baker buildings and structures